Gao Ping (born Chengdu, 1970) is a Chinese composer and professor of composition at the Conservatory of Music at Capital Normal University in Beijing. He has also taught composition at the University of Canterbury and University of Waikato in New Zealand.

Gao gained his D.Mus in composition from the University of Cincinnati University. He is professor in composition at the Conservatory of Music at Capital Normal University in Beijing. He also holds a guest professorship at the China Conservatory. From 2005 he taught composition at the School of Music at Canterbury University in Christchurch, New Zealand. He is also a research associate in the Department of Music at Waikato University. His 1988 China Record Company album Jazz in China was one of the first domestic jazz-classical albums released in China.

Born in Sichuan province, he grew up as a young pianist at the Sichuan Conservatory in Chengdu, Gao Ping was affected by China’s concurrent transformation from a collective to a market economy. This transitional phase between old and new and the productive cultural clash between East and West left traces, that would later be evident in his music. The Beijing-based musicologist and professor Li Xi’an has referred to Gao Ping as a leading member of the “sixth generation” of Chinese composers. Gao Ping’s works have won; wide acclaim throughout the world. His last chamber music release on Naxos was described by a German critic as “music which wants to be heard with ears of a child, full of wonder and amazement…deep and vulnerable.” In his recent works, Gao returns more fully to China as a creative theme. Works such as Piano Quintet “Mei Lan Zhu Ju” (2009) and The Four Not-Alike for multi-function pianist and Chinese instruments (2012) reflect the appeal of his fusing of Western and Eastern idioms, as well as the expanding interest in his compositions dealing with China and its multiple pasts.

Honours and awards 
In 2010 Gao was awarded the Composers Association of New Zealand Trust Fund award.

Selected works 

 Distant Voices (1999) - for piano
 Shuo Shu Ren or The Storyteller (2001) - for sextet
 Sonata No 2 for cello and piano (2001)
 Two Soviet Love Songs for Vocalising Pianist (2003)

References

1970 births
Living people